Lee Warburton (born 27 June 1971, Cheshire, England) is a British actor, known for several ongoing television roles.

He appeared in Coronation Street from 1995 to 1998 as Tony Horrocks, Natalie Barnes' drug addict son, played gay male healthcare assistant Tony Vincent in Casualty and its spin-off Holby City from 2001 to 2003, and played Melanie Costello's violent boyfriend Graham Harker in Family Affairs in 2004–2005.

His most recent television role was in Hollyoaks: In the City (2006).

He is a scriptwriter credited with several episodes of Scott & Bailey.

References

External links

1971 births
Living people
Male actors from Cheshire
English male television actors
English screenwriters
English male screenwriters